Queslett is an area of Great Barr, Birmingham, England.

The name (originally Quieslade) has been in use since the 16th century. The first part, from "Queest", means a wood pigeon, the second comes from the Anglo-Saxon "slade", for a small valley. Another old spelling, Queeslet, appears on Victorian maps and postcards.

The area was part of Staffordshire until 1928.

In 1810, in A Complete History of the Druids, T G Lomax described the area:

(the later being a reference to Robert Plot's Natural History of Staffordshire).

The area was mostly developed with private housing from the 1930s onwards, and is centred on the A4041 Queslett Road between West Bromwich and Sutton Coldfield, overlooked by Barr Beacon. A former sand quarry, on the site of William Booth's farm, was subsequently used for landfill. One half of the site is now Queslett Nature Reserve. The Moonstones, an artwork commemorating The Lunar Society, who met at nearby Great Barr Hall, stands in the grounds of a supermarket, on the site of the quarry's former office.

See also
The Moonstones

References 

Areas of Birmingham, West Midlands
Great Barr